The Birmingham Canal Navigations (BCN), a network of narrow canals in the industrial midlands of England, is built on various water levels. The three longest are the Wolverhampton, Birmingham, and Walsall levels. Locks allow boats to move from one level to another.

Heights given are nominal elevation above sea level in feet relative to the Ordnance Datum Liverpool.

533 ft Essington Branch
A former branch of the Wyrley and Essington Canal, the Essington Branch was abandoned before 1904 and is now filled in. It was the highest level on the BCN.

511 ft Titford Summit
The highest canal currently in BCN, 1 mile of which remains navigable. It was fed from the 18th century Titford Reservoir (now under Junction 2 of the M5 motorway) originally by feeder, and since 1837 by the Titford Canal. A feeder from the Tat Bank Branch (also known as Spon Lane Branch) supplies water to Edgbaston Reservoir.

491 ft Brindley's Smethwick Summit
A historical level, no longer existing. The highest level designed by James Brindley for his Birmingham Canal (BCN Old Main Line). Removed by John Smeaton's design in 1790.

473 ft Wolverhampton Level

A total of 41.7 miles navigable without locks:
BCN Old Main Line Wolverhampton top lock to Smethwick locks, 11.6 miles
Walsall Branch Canal to Walsall top lock, 0.4 miles
Wyrley and Essington Canal 15.4 miles, + branches:
Lord Hay's Branch (now dry)
Cannock Extension Canal, 1.8 miles navigable
Daw End Branch to Rushall top lock, 5.3 miles
Anglesey Branch, 2.5 miles
Wednesbury Oak Loop, 1.9 miles
Engine Arm, 0.5 miles
Dudley Canal to Parkhead locks (including Dudley Tunnel), 2.3 miles

453 ft Birmingham Level

A total of 49.2 miles at this level (21.2 miles of which is on the BCN) navigable without locks.
BCN Main Line, 10.8 miles navigable
BCN Old Main Line, south of Smethwick Locks
BCN New Main Line - Birmingham to Tipton Factory Bottom Lock, Island line, New Line at Smethwick
 Newhall Branch to Farmer's Bridge Junction, 0.2 miles
Gower Branch Canal to Brades Hall locks, 0.5 miles
Netherton Tunnel Branch Canal, 2.4 miles to Windmill End Junction
Wednesbury Old Canal and Ridgacre Branch, 1.4 miles navigable
Dudley No. 2 Canal from Parkhead locks (Blower's Green) to Hawne Basin (originally to Selly Oak), and Bumble Hole Branch Canal, 5.9 miles navigable.
Gas Street Basin

Connecting canals, not part of the BCN, but using this level:
Worcester and Birmingham Canal to Tardebigge top lock, 17 miles
Northern Stratford-upon-Avon Canal from Kings Norton Junction to Lapworth Top Lock, 11 miles

441 ft Dudley No. 1
Dudley Canal, 1.8 miles navigable without locks.

408 ft Walsall Level
A total of 13.4 miles navigable without locks.
Walsall Canal (Ryders Green bottom lock to Walsall Town Wharf), 6.5 miles, + branches:
Ocker Hill Tunnel Branch (private moorings), 0.2 miles navigable.
Gospel Oak Branch, 0.1 miles navigable.
Bradley Branch, part (abandoned)
Bilston Branch (abandoned)
Willenhall Branch (abandoned)
Anson Branch (abandoned)
Tame Valley Canal to Perry Barr top lock,  5.7 miles.
Rushall Canal (Rushall junction to Rushall bottom lock), 0.9 miles.

Reservoirs
To keep the canals topped up with water, reservoirs were built to collect water from streams. These had to be above the relevant canal levels, often some distance away. The small Titford Reservoir (Titford Pool), as well as feeding the Titford Canal supplies its surplus water to Edgbaston Reservoir along a feeder through Smethwick. Water from Edgbaston Reservoir feeds the Birmingham Level at the adjacent Icknield Port Loop, and once fed the Wolverhampton Level via a long feeder (now overgrown and dry) along the top of a raised embankment along Telford's BCN New Main Line to the Engine Arm. Water is also supplied by Chasewater and  Netherton Reservoirs.

Water pumping

Water was a precious resource, spent each time a lock was emptied as a boat changed level. Steam pumps were employed at many flights of locks to pump water back to a higher level, for example, the Smethwick Engine.

Back pumping at locks
Ashtead
Titford
Perry Barr
Walsall
Dudley Parkhead
Back pumping between levels
Ocker Hill
Smethwick Summit
Spon Lane engine (1778–1790) pumping Wolverhampton level to 491 ft Summit level, closed by Smeaton's removal of the Summit level
Smethwick Engine (1779–1898) pumping Birmingham level to 491 ft Summit level, pumping to Wolverhampton level after Summit lowered. It was replaced in 1892 by two centrifugal engines in a new pumphouse north of Brasshouse Lane Bridge, Smethwick.
Pumping to reservoirs
Edgbaston Reservoir (Rotton Park)
Chasewater Reservoir (Cannock Chase)
Lodge Farm Reservoir (Netherton)
Sneyd Reservoir (Bloxwich)
Water was also pumped out from many coal mines into the canal system.

See also

Canals of the United Kingdom
History of the British canal system

References

Mileages extracted from Nicholson's Waterways Guides vols. 2 & 3, and www.canalplan.org.uk

Birmingham Canal Navigations